Acupalpus cantabricus is an insect-eating ground beetle of the Acupalpus genus.

cantabricus
Beetles described in 1868